In enzymology, an uronate dehydrogenase is an enzyme that catalyzes the chemical reaction

D-galacturonate + NAD+ + H2O   + NADH + H+

This enzyme belongs to the family of oxidoreductases, specifically those acting on the CH-OH group of donor with NAD+ or NADP+ as acceptor. The systematic name of this enzyme class is uronate:NAD+ 1-oxidoreductase. Other names in common use include uronate: NAD-oxidoreductase, and uronic acid dehydrogenase.

References

 

EC 1.1.1
NADH-dependent enzymes
Enzymes of known structure